Ghana competed at the 2004 Summer Paralympics in Athens, Greece. Ghana made their Paralympic debut at the 2004 Games. The team included 3 athletes, 2 men and 1 women, but won no medals.

Sports

Athletics

Men's track

Women's track

Powerlifting

See also
Ghana at the Paralympics
Ghana at the 2004 Summer Olympics

References 

Nations at the 2004 Summer Paralympics
2004
Summer Paralympics